German submarine U-905 was a Type VIIC U-boat of Nazi Germany's Kriegsmarine during World War II.

She was ordered on 6 August 1942, and was laid down on 26 January 1943 at H. C. Stülcken Sohn, Hamburg, as yard number 802. She was launched on 20 November 1943 and commissioned under the command of Oberleutnant zur See Heinz-Ehler Brüllau on 8 March 1944.

Design
German Type VIIC submarines were preceded by the shorter Type VIIB submarines. U-905 had a displacement of  when at the surface and  while submerged. She had two shafts and two  propellers.

U-905 was fitted with five  torpedo tubes (four fitted at the bow and one at the stern), fourteen torpedoes or 26 TMA mines, one  SK C/35 naval gun, (220 rounds), one  Flak M42 and two twin  C/30 anti-aircraft guns. The boat had a complement of between 44 — 52 men.

Service history
On 27 March 1945, U-905 was sunk by depth charges in the North Minch in the North Atlantic, by the British frigate . Oberleutnant zur See Bernhard Schwarting and 44 other crewmen were all lost.

References

Bibliography

External links

German Type VIIC submarines
U-boats commissioned in 1944
World War II submarines of Germany
Ships built in Hamburg
1943 ships
Maritime incidents in March 1945
World War II shipwrecks in the Atlantic Ocean